Neuville-près-Sées (literally Neuville near Sées) is a former commune in the Orne department in north-western France. On 1 January 2016, it was merged into the commune of Chailloué.

See also
Communes of the Orne department

References

Neuvillepressees